The 1952 Coupe de France Final was a football match held at Stade Olympique Yves-du-Manoir, Colombes on May 4, 1952, that saw OGC Nice defeat FC Girondins de Bordeaux 5–3 with goals by Victor Nuremberg, Luis Carniglia, Jean Belver, Abdelaziz Ben Tifour and Georges Césari.

Match details

See also
1951–52 Coupe de France

External links
Coupe de France results at Rec.Sport.Soccer Statistics Foundation
Report on French federation site

Coupe
1952
Coupe De France Final 1952
Coupe De France Final 1952
Sport in Hauts-de-Seine
Coupe de France Final
Coupe de France Final